Jeremy Transue is an American alpine skier.  Born June 1, 1983, Jeremy was introduced to skiing at 18 months.  He began racing at age 6 at Hunter Mountain, New York, where his father Bruce was Operations Manager.  For high school, he attended the Green Valley Mountain School in Vermont where he honed his racing abilities.  Later on, he joined the US Ski Team (USST) as a C-Squad member.  However, since the C-Squad is age-capped at 24, Jeremy came under pressure to achieve and move up to B-Squad.  After winning three late-season FIS races in 2007, including the absolute last of the season by a one-second margin, "Worm," as he is known, came through.  A member of the USST B-Squad from 2007 to 2009, he was ranked in the top 100 worldwide in the Super-G and Downhill disciplines. Jeremy was sponsored by the Rossignol ski company. He retired in 2009 after a career-best 34th-place finish on the FIS Alpine Ski World Cup. He coached at Green Mountain Valley School for several years before moving to New York to coach at New York Ski Education Foundation (NYSEF).

References
 FIS Bio
 USST Bio
 Stowe Reporter article
 NYSEF Announces Jeremy Transue as Head Women's Alpine Coach
 32 Random Questions with U.S. Ski Team Member Jeremy Transue
 Eurosport profile

American male alpine skiers
People from the Catskills
1983 births
Living people